Liberty Township is a township in Scott County, Iowa, USA.  As of the 2000 census, its population was 746.

Geography
According to the USGS, it contains six cemeteries: Big Rock, Dixon, New Liberty, Pioneer, Round Grove and Saint Patricks.

References
 USGS Geographic Names Information System (GNIS)

External links
 US-Counties.com
 City-Data.com

Townships in Scott County, Iowa
Townships in Iowa